During the 2006–07 English football season, Sheffield Wednesday F.C. competed in the Football League Championship.

Season summary
In the 2006-07 season, manager Paul Sturrock was sacked after Sheffield Wednesday's slow start. He was replaced by former Scunthorpe United boss Brian Laws. They finished ninth in the Championship that season, just four points short of the play-offs.

Final league table

Results
Sheffield Wednesday's score comes first

Legend

Football League Championship

FA Cup

League Cup

Squad

Left club during season

Transfers

In
  Yoann Folly -  Southampton
  Leon Clarke -  Wolves, nominal
  Jermaine Johnson -  Bradford City, £500,000

Out
  Patrick Collins -  Darlington, free
  Drissa Diallo -  MK Dons, free
  Craig Rocastle -  Oldham Athletic, free
  Jon-Paul McGovern -  MK Dons, free
  Ben Kirby -  Boston United, free
  Rory McArdle -  Rochdale, nominal
  Drew Talbot -  Luton Town, £250,000
  Madjid Bougherra -  Charlton Athletic, £2,500,000

References

2006-07
Sheffield Wednesday